HMS Moy was a Laird Type River-class destroyer of the Royal Navy. Named after the River Moy in Ireland, she was the first ship to carry this name in the Royal Navy.

Construction
She was ordered under the 1903 – 1904 Naval Estimates, laid down on 22 March 1904, at Cammell Laird's shipyard at Birkenhead and launched on 10 November 1904. She was completed in June 1905. Her original armament was to be the same as the turtleback torpedo boat destroyers that preceded her. In 1906 the Admiralty decided to upgrade the armament by landing the five 6-pounder naval guns and shipping three 12-pounder/8 hundredweight (cwt) guns). Two would be mounted abeam at the foc's'le break and the third gun would be mounted on the quarterdeck.

Pre-War
After commissioning she was assigned to the East Coast Destroyer Flotilla of the 1st Fleet and based at Harwich. On 27 April 1908, the Eastern Flotilla departed Harwich for live fire and night manoeuvres.  During these exercises HMS Attentive rammed and sank HMS Gala then damaged HMS Ribble. In April 1909 she was assigned to the 3rd Destroyer Flotilla on its formation at Harwich.  She remained until displaced by a Beagle-class destroyer by May 1912.  She went into reserve assigned to the 5th Destroyer Flotilla of the Second Fleet with a nucleus crew. On 30 August 1912 the Admiralty directed all destroyer classes were to be designated by alpha characters starting with the letter 'A'.  The ships of the River class were assigned to the E class.  After 30 September 1913, she was known as an E class destroyer and had the letter ‘E’ painted on the hull below the bridge area and on either the fore or aft funnel.

First World War
In early 1914 when displaced by G-class destroyers she joined the 9th Destroyer Flotilla based at Chatham tendered to HMS St George.  The 9th Flotilla was a patrol flotilla tasked with anti-submarine and counter-mining patrols in the Firth of Forth area. On 16 December 1914 under division leader HMS Doon along with HMS Waveney, HMS Test and HMS Moy under the command of Lieutenant C. C. Naylor were sent to patrol off Hartlepool.  During the German Battlecruiser raid on Hartlepool, she was damaged by German shellfire.  She was struck by fragments from a shell, bursting short and superficial suffered splinter damage and no casualties. In August 1915 with the amalgamation of the 9th and 7th Flotillas she was deployed to the 7th Destroyer Flotilla based at the River Humber.  She remained employed on the Humber Patrol participating in counter-mining operations and anti-submarine patrols for the remainder of the war.

Disposition
In 1919 HMS Moy was paid off then laid up in reserve awaiting disposal.  On 27 May 1919 she was sold to T Oakley for scrapping.

She was not awarded a Battle Honour for her service.

Pennant Numbers

References

Bibliography
 
 
 
 
 
 
 

 

River-class destroyers
Ships built on the River Mersey
1904 ships
World War I destroyers of the United Kingdom